The Ponderer is an album by the American jazz saxophonist Odean Pope recorded in 1990 and released on the Italian Soul Note label.

Reception
The Allmusic review awarded the album 4½ stars.

Track listing
All compositions by Odean Pope except as indicated
 "Overture" - 6:10 
 "I Wish I Knew" (Mack Gordon, Harry Warren) - 1:56 
 "Out for a Walk Part 1" - 3:34 
 "Out for a Walk Part 2" - 3:43 
 "The Ponderer" - 9:11 
 "Little M's Lady" (Eddie Green) - 5:32 
 "Phrygian Love Theme" - 10:21 
 "One for Bubba" (Green) - 5:16 
Recorded at Platinum Factory, Inc. in Brooklyn, New York on March 12, 1990

Personnel
Odean Pope, Glenn Guidone, Middy Middleton, John Simon, Bob Howell  – tenor saxophone
Julian Pressley, Sam Reed, Byard Lancaster – alto saxophone
Joe Sudler – baritone saxophone 
Eddie Green – piano
Gerald Veasley – electric bass
Tyrone Brown – bass
Cornell Rochester – drums

References

Black Saint/Soul Note albums
Odean Pope albums
1990 albums